Marvel Heroes is a strategy fantasy board game for two to four players. Designed by Marco Maggi and Francesco Nepitello, with Roberto Di Meglio, Simone Peruzzi e Salvatore Pierucci, was created by Nexus Editrice. The English version was released by Fantasy Flight Games in 2006.

Overview
Each player chooses to play one of four 4-character Marvel Comics superhero teams. Each player also controls the archenemy of one of the opponents' team to the left of you. These 20 characters, listed below, are represented in the game by fully colored miniatures; other heroes, villains, and characters in the Marvel Universe are represented by cards which influence game play. Each turn, a player manipulates one or more of his four main heroes and plays cards to solve mysteries, stop crimes and defeat villains.

Teams
The four superhero teams are available for play and the characters represented by miniatures in the game include:

Marvel Knights
 Spider-Man
 Daredevil
 Elektra
 Doctor Strange

 Archenemy: Kingpin

X-Men
 Wolverine
 Cyclops
 Storm
 Phoenix

 Archenemy: Magneto

Fantastic Four
 Mr. Fantastic
 Invisible Woman
 Thing
 Human Torch

 Archenemy: Doctor Doom

Avengers
 Captain America
 Thor
 Iron Man
 Hulk

 Archenemy: Red Skull

Board
The game board is of New York City. It is split into 6 Areas, each a different colour. These areas are Upper Manhattan, Central Manhattan, The Village, Lower Manhattan, Queens and Brooklyn.

The Areas are then split into 4 Districts.

Upper Manhattan
 Central Harlem
 Morningside Heights
 East Harlem
 Carnegie Hall

Central Manhattan
 Central Park
 Upper West Side
 Upper East Side
 Midtown

The Village
 Hell's Kitchen
 Chelsea
 Greenwich Village
 East Side

Lower Manhattan
 East Village
 Lower East Side
 Tribeca
 Financial District

Queens
 Astoria
 Steinway
 Long Island City
 Sunnyside

Brooklyn
 Greenpoint
 Williamsburg
 Bedford–Stuyvesant
 Brooklyn Heights

Reviews
Pyramid

References

External links
Marvel Heroes, Items Base
Review of Marvel Heroes by Tom Vasel

Board games introduced in 2006
Fantasy Flight Games games
Licensed board games
Marvel Comics games